"Glicine" is a song by Italian singer Noemi. It was written by Mahmood, Ginevra, Dardust and Francesco Fugazza and produced by Dardust.

It was released by Sony Music on 3 March 2021 as the first single from the seventh studio album Metamorfosi. The song was Noemi's entry for the Sanremo Music Festival 2021, the 71st edition of Italy's musical festival which doubles also as a selection of the act for Eurovision Song Contest, where it placed 14th in the grand final. "Glicine" peaked at number 12 on the Italian FIMI Singles Chart and was certified platinum in Italy.

Background
The song deals with the theme of rebirth, telling the story of a woman who finds the strength to renew herself after the conclusion of a love story despite the nostalgic emotions of her memory. Regarding the image of the wisteria, the artist stated: "It has fragile flowers that seem to break in a breath, but branches so strong that over time they even bend iron. Wisteria has a lot to teach you about how nice it would be to be in the world. Blossoming of a delicate antique, cheeky pink, however, in the deep blue of the night, despite long and tenacious roots that give us life but often also entangle it".

Music video
The music video for the song was released on YouTube on 3 March 2021, to accompany the single's release. It was directed by Attilio Cusani.

Live performances
On 11 April 2021 Noemi performed the song on Che tempo che fa.

Track listing

Charts

Certifications

References

2021 singles
2021 songs
Noemi (singer) songs
Sanremo Music Festival songs
Songs written by Dario Faini
Songs written by Mahmood